Fayolia is a prehistoric shark egg capsule morphotype of the family Xenacanthidae. It is predominantly known from freshwater deposits with a stratigraphic range from the Late Devonian to the Triassic. A new species, Fayolia sharovi, was described in 2011 from lacustrine deposits of the Middle Triassic Madygen Formation in Kyrgyzstan, Central Asia.

References

Devonian sharks
Carboniferous sharks
Permian sharks
Triassic sharks
Triassic fish of Asia
Egg fossils
Madygen Formation